The Tintina Fault is a large right-lateral strike-slip fault in western North America, extending from northwestern British Columbia, Canada to the centre of the U.S. state of Alaska. It represents the Yukon continuum between the Rocky Mountain Trench in the northern United States and the Kaltag Fault in Alaska.

See also
Denali Fault
Rocky Mountain Trench
Northern Cordilleran Volcanic Province

References

Seismic faults of Canada
Seismic faults of Alaska
Geology of British Columbia
Geology of Yukon
Strike-slip faults